John Merritt Young (March 16, 1922 – April 16, 2008) was an American jazz pianist. Young played with Sarah Vaughan, Ella Fitzgerald, Dexter Gordon, and many others. He recorded with his own trio in the 1950s and 1960s, and was a sideman for Von Freeman, Gene Ammons and others. He remained active in the Chicago jazz scene until a few years before his death.

Biography
Young was born in Little Rock, Arkansas, and his family relocated to Chicago when he was a toddler. He first toured in the 1940s with the big band Andy Kirk and His Twelve Clouds of Joy. After Young left Kirk's band and returned to Chicago, he performed with the Dick Davis combo until 1950, when he formed his own combo with Eldridge Freeman on drums and Leroy Jackson on bass. In 1957, he signed with Argo Records and recorded his first LP, Opus de Funk.

He was active in the Chicago jazz scene, regularly playing popular clubs with artists such as Dexter Gordon, Big Joe Turner, Von Freeman and others. He made more than a dozen appearances at the Chicago Jazz Festival, often as a sideman for tenor saxophonist Eddie Johnson. He retired in 2005 due to sciatic nerve inflammation. He died from multiple myeloma on April 16, 2008.

Dan Morgenstern, in Living with Jazz, called Young "one of Chicago's several unsung piano originals". Allmusic.com called Young "criminally underappreciated outside of [the Chicago bop scene]".

Discography

As leader

As sideman
With Lorez Alexandria
Deep Roots (Argo, 1962)
 For Swingers Only (Argo, 1963)
With Gene Ammons and Dexter Gordon 
 The Chase! (Prestige, 1970)
With Bobby Bryant
 Big Band Blues (Vee Jay, 1961)
With George Freeman
New Improved Funk (Groove Merchant, 1973)
With Von Freeman	
 Doin' It Right Now (Atlantic, 1972)
 Have No Fear (Nessa, 1975)
 Young and Foolish, Von Freeman, (Nessa, 1977)
 Serenade & Blues, Von Freeman, (Nessa, 1979)
With Al Grey
 Boss Bone (Argo, 1963)
With Sonny Stitt and Zoot Sims 
 Inter-Action (Cadet, 1965)
With T-Bone Walker
 T-Bone Blues (Atlantic, 1959)

References

External links
Remembering John Young at ChicagoJazz.com

African-American jazz pianists
Musicians from Chicago
1922 births
2008 deaths
Musicians from Little Rock, Arkansas
20th-century American pianists
Jazz musicians from Illinois
American male pianists
Jazz musicians from Arkansas
20th-century American male musicians
American male jazz musicians
Deaths from multiple myeloma
Deaths from cancer in Illinois
20th-century African-American musicians
21st-century African-American people